The events of 1985 in anime.

Accolades
Anime Grand Prix:
Best Work: Dirty Pair 
Best Episode: episode 36 (Forever Four) of Mobile Suit Zeta Gundam 
Best Male Character: Tatsuya Uesugi (voiced by Yūji Mitsuya) from Touch 
Best Female Character: Four Murasame (voiced by Saeko Shimazu) from Mobile Suit Zeta Gundam
Best Voice Actor: Akira Kamiya
Best Voice Actress: Saeko Shimazu
Best Song: opening of Dirty Pair, Ro Ro Ro Russian roulette, sung by Meiko Nakahara
Ōfuji Noburō Award: Night on the Galactic Railroad

Releases

See also
1985 in animation

References

External links 
Japanese animated works of the year, listed in the IMDb

Anime
Anime
Years in anime